Deep Sea is a 2023 Chinese 3D animated fantasy film, written and directed by Tian Xiaopeng, who previously directed Monkey King: Hero Is Back. The film was released in China on 22 January 2023 (Chinese New Year).

Plot 
A young woman explores a strange underwater environment.

Original voice cast 
 Su Xin (苏鑫) as Nanhe
 Wang Tingwen (王亭文) as Shenxiu
 
 
 Ji Jing (吉静)
 Fang Taochen (方韬辰)
 Dong Yi (董一)

Release 
Deep Sea was scheduled for release on 22 January 2023 (Chinese New Year).

It was nominated for screening as part of Generation Kplus at the 73rd Berlin International Film Festival.

References

External links 
 
 
 

2023 films
2023 animated films
2023 in Chinese cinema
2023 computer-animated films
2023 3D films
Mandarin-language films
Chinese 3D films
Chinese fantasy adventure films
Films with underwater settings
IMAX films